Latvia have qualified for a UEFA European Championship once, the 2004 edition. After finishing second in their qualifying group, they won the two-legged play-offs against Turkey (3–2 on aggregate) to secure their first appearance in a major tournament finals. In doing so, Latvia became the first and so far only Baltic team to qualify for a European Championship.

At Euro 2004, Latvia were drawn in Group D, alongside Germany, the Czech Republic and the Netherlands. Latvia faced the Czech Republic in their opening match on 15 June 2004, with Māris Verpakovskis scoring before half-time. However, the Czechs would later come back to win the game 2–1. Four days later, Latvia earned a respectable 0–0 draw against World Cup runners-up Germany to earn their first point in a major tournament. They lost their final match 3–0 against the Netherlands, and were eliminated, finishing fourth in the group with one point from their draw and two losses.

Euro 2004

Group stage

Overall record

References

 
Countries at the UEFA European Championship